Dean Arthur Miller (July 29, 1931 - January 28, 2018) was an American historian who was Professor of History at the University of Rochester. He specialized in the classics, Celtic studies and Indo-European studies, with a particular focus on Heroic poetry.

Biography
Dean A. Miller was born in Chicago on July 29, 1931, the son of Donald Braud Miller and Bessie Garrison. He graduated from Rock Island High School in 1949. From 1955 to 1958 he served in the Counterintelligence Corps of the United States Army at Fort Meade, Maryland. He received his Bachelor's degree in history from Northwestern University in 1953, his Master's degree in Byzantine history from Columbia University in 1958, and his PhD in history from Rutgers University in 1963. His dissertation was on Byzantine diplomacy.

After serving as an assistant professor at Saint Peter's College, Miller was appointed an associate professor at University of Rochester in 1963. Books published by Miller during this time include The Byzantine Tradition (1966) and Imperial Constantinople (1969). Within seven years at Rochester he was appointed a full professor of history there, and also held a secondary appointment in religion and classics. Miller researched a diverse set of subjects, including the Byzantine Empire, Ancient Sparta, Greek mythology and Indo-European studies. He was proficient in a large number of languages, including Latin, Ancient Greek, French, German, and Russian, Old Church Slavonic and Bulgarian. Miller was an adherent of Georges Dumézil's research on Indo-European religion, and published several papers on the relevance of Dumézil's work.

Miller retired from the University of Rochester in 1993, but continued research, write and attend academic conferences. He was a mythology editor for the Journal of Indo-European Studies. His magnum opus, The Epic Hero, was published in 2000. It was the result of 20 years of scholarship, drew on interdiciplinary research spanning the fields of classics, anthropology, psychology, philology, and spanned all the Western epic traditions, including Greek, Roman, Nordic and Celtic, in addition to Indian and Persian. The Epic Hero was selected as an Outstanding Academic Title by Choice.

Married three times. He married his first wife, Elizabeth Walter, on January 16, 1955, with whom he had the sons Douglas and Kenneth. He married his second wife, Mona Schekter, on January 24, 1966, with whom he had the sons Scott and Eric. He subsequently married Marta Swift, who died in 2017. Miller was a member of the Democratic Party.

Miller died at his home in Chicago on January 28, 2018. He was survived by his four sons.

Selected works
 The Byzatine Tradition, 1966
 Imperial Constantinople, 1969
 The Tie That Blinds: The UN/Vatican Connection, 1999
 The Epic Hero, 2000

See also
 C. Scott Littleton
 Hector Munro Chadwick
 Jaan Puhvel
 Calvert Watkins
 Mircea Eliade
 Martin Litchfield West
 Donald J. Ward
 Nicholas Allen

References

Sources

 
 

1931 births
2018 deaths
American classical scholars
American historians
Celtic studies scholars
Columbia Graduate School of Arts and Sciences alumni
Mythographers
Indo-Europeanists
United States Army soldiers
Northwestern University alumni
Rutgers University people
Saint Peter's University faculty
University of Rochester faculty